Saath Nibhaana Saathiya is an Indian Hindi-language soap opera produced by Rashmi Sharma under Rashmi Sharma Telefilms. It premiered on 3 May 2010 on Star Plus and became one of the most popular and longest running television series. The series starred Giaa Manek, Devoleena Bhattacharjee, Rucha Hasabnis, Rupal Patel, Mohammad Nazim, Vishal Singh, Loveleen Kaur Sasan, Tanya Sharma, Sonam Lamba, Amar Upadhyay, Kunal Singh and Rohit Suchanti.

This series revolved around the Modi family and explored morals and values of a typical Gujarati joint family, when cousins Gopi and Rashi marry Modi sons, Ahem and Jigar; after leaps, it also focused simultaneously on the second generation. The storyline took several leaps including one year leap in June 2013, eight year leap in February 2014, ten years in February 2015, four years in May 2016 and three months in March 2017. The series ended on 23 July 2017, completing 2,184 episodes with its time slot taken by Tu Sooraj, Main Saanjh Piyaji.

The second season of the series, Saath Nibhaana Saathiya 2 premiered on 19 October 2020 on Star Plus starring Devoleena Bhattacharjee, Rupal Patel, Nazim in cameos and Sneha Jain and Harsh Nagar in lead role.

Plot 
Gopi, an illiterate, kind and shy girl, has been adopted by her aunt and uncle, Urmila and Jeetu after her parents' death. Urmila and Jeetu's daughter, Rashi Shah, is educated, friendly, lively and cunning. Gopi and Rashi marry cousins Ahem and Jigar, the sons of Modi family. Kokila, Ahem's steadfast and kind-hearted mother, makes Gopi smarter and confident so he accept her. Rashi often tries to create trouble for her but later regrets, and both are happily accepted. Ahem's sister, Kinjal gets married to Rashi's cousin, Dhaval. Later, Gopi and Ahem have a daughter, Meera while Rashi and Jigar have twin sons, Sahir and Samar.

Gopi finds out her parents are actually alive and unites with them. Her evil sister, Radha marries Umang Mehta, whose first wife Tripti kills him. Radha blames Gopi for Umang's death and decides to hurt Meera. Gopi finds out she is pregnant again, but unable to tell the family. When the family is out at a picnic, Radha orchestrates an accident which results in Gopi accidentally throwing Meera in the river. Kokila holds Gopi responsible for Meera's death, and makes her leave the house for taking away the family's happiness.

8 years later
Gopi gives birth and raises her and Ahem's second daughter, Vidya single-handedly, working as an art teacher in Somgarh. Kokila and Ahem are depressed due to the loss of Meera and Gopi. Rashi is the new matriarch of the Modi family. Kinjal and Dhaval have a son, Prateek. Along with Sahir, Samar and Prateek, Vidya learns that Ahem is her father. Soon, Gopi meets Ahem and revealed that Vidya is their own daughter. Eventually, Gopi and Ahem find their long-lost daughter, Meera, who grew up as an orphan named Gauri. The whole family is reunited after Radha's true colors are revealed, and she is sent to jail with Tripti.

Rashi's cousin, Paridhi enters into Modi house. Later, Rashi sacrifices her life to save Gopi from the latter's obsessed colleague, Anurag Joshi. Jigar goes into depression due to Rashi's demise. Paridhi starts impress Modis. Jigar marries Paridhi, in force of his family.

Radha returns, tricks Jigar into sleeping with her, and gets pregnant. Soon Radha delivers a daughter, who is also named Rashi .Paridhi being mother and took responsibility of Rashi where as Radha threatens to kill baby Rashi. The Modi family follows her. Gopi realizes that her sister will never reform and stabs Radha to death and is sentenced to 14 years.

10 years later 

Gopi is released after 10 years, 4 years being reduced from her 14 years sentence due to her good behavior. She returns to her family without letting the jail authorities inform her family about her release, as she wants to surprise them. However, Gopi is shocked seeing the many twists happened in Modi family. Kokila lives in Rashi's house as a maid to a mentally disabled Urmila. Jr. Rashi was not accepted by Paridhi after Gopi went to prison. Kinjal lives away from her husband and son in Modi Mansion. Ahem lives with Meera, Vidya and a woman, Mansi Raheja (who took care of Meera and Vidya) in Bandra, Mumbai and runs a Bakery shop by the name MV (after Meera-Vidya).

Gopi, Jigar and Kokila travel to Mumbai to bring back Ahem and Meera-Vidya. The personalities of Meera and Vidya have changed so drastically that Gopi couldn't recognize them initially. The silent, gentle and caring Meera has turned aggressive, rebellious and disrespectful towards elders. The fun-loving, naughty Vidya has turned gentle and takes care of Meera, as opposed to how Meera took care of her in their childhood.

Ahem, Meera and Vidya blame Gopi for abandoning them for Jr. Rashi and hate her. Ahem attempts to show he doesn't care Gopi anymore. Meera accidentally pushes Gopi from building but is saved by Ahem for which Ahem has performed puja for her. Eventually, Gopi manages to reunite the family. However, Meera refuses to accept Gopi and creates many problems for her. Kinjal, Dhawal and Prateek leave for America.

Later, Kokila's childhood friend, Gaura enters to take revenge for her brother's death, caused by Kokila's mistake. Vidya's marriage is arranged to Gaura's grandson, Shravan. Gaura secretly gets Meera married to her son & Shravan's father Dharam. Equally involved in the revenge game with Gaura, Dharam traps Meera in their plan by constantly instigating her against Modi family.

During this time, Gopi's mother, Madhu returns with her adopted daughter Sonakshi "Sona". She blames Kokila for Radha's death & having alienated Gopi from her, so she seeks revenge. In collaboration with Gaura, she gets Kokila kidnapped & had her replaced by a dopple-ganger named Premlata. Premlata nearly killed Kokila by electrocution but Gopi saves Kokila & exposes Premlata. Madhu then tries to stab Kokila but Gopi comes to Kokila's rescue & gets stabbed. Unable to bear the guilt of having stabbed her own daughter, Madhu commits suicide. Gopi survives & Sona marries Sahir. Paridhi returns from America & refuses to accept Sona as daughter in law. Meera accepts Gopi and apologize to her. Gaura attempts to kill Kokila, and hurt the Modis several times, but she is eventually caught and arrested.

Dharam and Meera gradually fall in love and they get remarried. On the same day, Ahem dies from a car accident arranged by Gaura.

4 years later 
Gopi is in depression since Ahem's demise having not talked for years. Kokila has to look after Gopi on her own. Paridhi and Jigar's personality have changed and they did not care for the family. Hetal, Chirag, Baa and Jr. Rashi live in Canada. Paridhi has thrown Sahir, Sona and their kids out of Modi mansion and gets Samar married to an educated fashionista, Monica.

On the other hand, Vidya has a 4-year-old daughter, Priyal, but is hated by Meera who believes that Vidya was responsible for her miscarriage. Later they reunite after Dharam's daughter, Naiya is exposed as the real culprit, who did it for the sake of inheritance.

Kokila accepts Dr. Krishna Raheja's marriage proposal for Gopi, who recovers and refuses. Krishna is revealed to be Mansi's brother, who vows revenge on Gopi for separating Mansi from Ahem. Soon, Gopi and Kokila meet Ahem's look-alike Jaggi and ask him to save Gopi from Krishna's evil plans and later the Modis were successful. Later, It is revealed that Jaggi is Parag and Urvashi's illegitimate son and revealed to be Ahem and Kinjal's half-brother. Jigar leaves for America.

Gopi marries Jaggi to save him from the traps of an evil girl Radhika. Gaura returns and pays Chanda, the surrogate mother of Meera and Dharam's twins, to create troubles for Modis and kills her when she attempts to expose her. Paridhi and Monica leave to America.

Eventually, Gaura's crimes are caught and she is sent to prison for the accident that led to Ahem's death. The Modis rescue Sita Rathod from a forced marriage whose step-mother, Bhavani falls in love with Dharam and compels Meera to leave the house.

Gopi learns from her friend, Antara, who is in her deathbed, that she gave birth to a twins during Vidya's birth,her long-lost son Ramakant( Meera and Vidya brother). Antara had cheated Gopi by swapping baby boy from Gopi's twins. Ramakant has grown into a spoiled and selfish young man of Singapore. Gopi and Jaggi retrieve Ramakant who heavily troubles the Modis. Later, the Modis arrange his marriage to Sita.

Ramakant elopes with and marries Anita's daughter, Sameera who wants revenge from the Modis for Anita's death. She joins hands with Bhavani to ruin the Modi family. All the crimes of Bhavani and Sameera are revealed. Ramakant apologizes for his past mistakes to Modi family. In the final episode, Ramakant marries Sita and Gopi remembers her journey in Modi Bhawan ending the saga on a happy note.

Cast

Main
 Giaa Manek as Gopi Kapadia Modi: Jayantilal and Madhu's elder daughter; Radha's sister; Rashi's cousin; Ahem's widow; Jaggi's wife; Meera, Vidya and Ramakant's mother; Priyal, Medha and Jr. Ahem's grandmother. (2010–2012)
Devoleena Bhattacharjee replaced Manek as Gopi (2012–2017)
 Rucha Hasabnis as Rashi Shah Modi: Jitu and Urmila's daughter; Gopi, Radha, Dhaval and Paridhi's cousin; Jigar's first wife; Sahir and Samar's mother; Jai, Veeru, Geeta and Jr. Sita's grandmother (2010–2014) (Dead)
 Rupal Patel as Kokila Sanghvi Modi: Revati's elder daughter; Praful, Jigna and Paresh's sister; Parag's first wife; Ahem and Kinjal's mother; Jaggi's step-mother; Meera, Vidya, Ramakant and Prateek's grandmother; Medha and Jr. Ahem's great-grandmother. (2010–2017)
 Mohammad Nazim as
 Ahem Modi: Parag and Kokila's son; Kinjal's brother; Jaggi's half-brother; Jigar's cousin; Gopi's first husband; Meera, Vidya and Ramakant's father; Priyal, and Jr. Ahem's grandfather (2010–2016) (Dead)
 Jaggi Modi: Parag and Urvashi's son; Kokila's step-son; Ahem and Kinjal's half-brother; Jigar's cousin; Gopi's second husband; Meera, Vidya and Ramakant's step-father (2016–2017)
 Vishal Singh as Jigar Modi: Chirag and Hetal's son; Ahem, Jaggi and Kinjal's cousin; Rashi's widower; Paridhi's husband; Sahir, Samar and Jr. Rashi's father; Jai, Veeru, Geeta and Jr. Sita's grandfather (2010–2016)
 Loveleen Kaur Sasan as Paridhi Mehta Modi: Jay and Veena's daughter; Rashi and Dhaval's cousin; Jigar's second wife; Sahir, Samar and Jr. Rashi's step-mother; Jai, Veeru, Geeta and Jr. Sita's step-grandmother (2014–2017)
 Tanya Sharma as Meera Modi Suryavanshi: Gopi and Ahem's elder daughter; Vidya and Ramakant's sister; Sahir, Samar, Prateek and Jr. Rashi's cousin; Dharam's second wife; Medha and Jr. Ahem's mother (2015–2017)
 Mazel Vyas as Child Meera "Gauri" Modi (2014–2015)
 Mahi / Riti Bafna as Baby Meera Modi (2012–2013) / (2013–2014)
 Sonam Lamba as Vidya Modi Suryavanshi: Gopi and Ahem's younger daughter; Meera and Ramakant's a  sister; Sahir, Samar, Prateek and Jr. Rashi's  cousin; Shravan's wife; Priyal's mother (2015–2017)
 Palak Panchal as Child Vidya Modi (2014–2015)
 Amar Upadhyay as Dharam Suryavanshi: Gaura's son; Durga and Meera's husband; Shravan, Naiya, Medha and Jr. Ahem's father; Priyal's grandfather (2015–2017)
 Kunal Singh as Shravan Suryavanshi: Dharam and Durga's son; Naiya's brother; Medha and Jr. Ahem's half-brother; Vidya's husband; Priyal's father (2015–2017)
 Rohit Suchanti as Ramakant "Ricky" Modi: Gopi and Ahem's long-lost son; Meera and Vidya's brother; Sahir, Samar, Prateek and Jr. Rashi's cousin; Sameera's ex-husband; Sita's husband (2017)
 Shruti Prakash as Sita Rathod Modi: Keshavlal's daughter; Bhavani's step-daughter; Ramakant's second wife (2017)

Recurring
 Manish Arora as Parag Modi: Tolaram and Janko's younger son; Chirag's brother; Urvashi and Kokila's husband; Ahem, Jaggi and Kinjal's father; Meera, Vidya , Ramakant and Prateek's grandfather; Medha and Jr. Ahem's great-grandfather. (2010–2017)
 Neeraj Bharadwaj as Chirag Modi: Tolaram and Janko's elder son; Parag's brother; Hetal's husband; Jigar's father; Sahir, Samar and Jr. Rashi's grandfather; Jai, Veeru, Geeta and Jr. Sita's great-grandfather (2010–2016)
 Swati Shah as Hetal Modi: Chirag's wife; Jigar's mother; Sahir, Samar and Jr. Rashi's grandmother; Jai, Veeru, Geeta and Jr. Sita's great-grandmother (2010–2016)
 Vandana Vithlani as Urmila Shah: Veena and Baldev's sister; Jitu's wife; Rashi's mother; Sahir and Samar's grandmother (2010–2017)
 Jyotsna Karyekar / Aparna Kanekar as Janko "Baa" Modi: Tolaram's widow; Chirag and Parag's mother; Ahem, Jaggi, Jigar and Kinjal's grandmother; Meera, Vidya, Sahir, Samar, Ramakant, Prateek and Jr. (2010–2016)
 Firoza Khan as Kinjal Modi Desai: Parag and Kokila's daughter; Ahem's sister; Jaggi's half-sister; Jigar's cousin; Dhaval's wife; Prateek's mother (2010–2016)
 Ashish Sharma as Dhaval Desai: Baldev's son; Paridhi and Rashi's cousin; Kinjal's husband; Prateek's father (2011–2015)
 Jaya Ojha as Madhu Shah Kapadia: Jitu's sister; Jayantilal's wife; Gopi and Radha's mother; Sonakshi's adoptive mother; Meera, Vidya, Ramakant and Jr. Rashi's grandmother (2013–2016) (Dead)
 Sanjeev Bhatt as Jayantilal Kapadia: Madhu's husband; Gopi and Radha's father; Meera, Vidya, Ramakant and Jr. Rashi's grandfather (2013–2014)
 Bhavini Purohit as Radha Kapadia Mehta: Jayantilal and Madhu's younger daughter; Gopi's sister; Rashi's cousin; Umang's widow; Jr. Rashi's mother (2013–2015) (Dead)
 Susheel Johari as Jitu Shah: Madhu's brother; Urmila's husband; Rashi's father; Sahir and Samar's grandfather (2010–2014)
 Paras Babbar as Sahir "Tolu" Modi: Rashi and Jigar's elder son; Samar's brother; Jr. Rashi's half-brother; Meera, Vidya, Ramakant and Prateek's cousin; Sonakshi's husband; Jai, Veeru, Gita and Jr. Sita's father (2015–2017)
 Ishant Bhanushali as Child Sahir "Tolu" Modi (2014–2015)
 Rashmi Singh as Sonakshi "Sona" Modi: Madhu's adoptive daughter; Sahir's wife; Jai, Veeru, Gita and Jr. Sita's mother (2015–2017)
 Pratap Hada as Samar "Molu" Modi: Rashi and Jigar's younger son; Sahir's brother; Jr. Rashi's half-brother; Meera, Vidya, Ramakant and Prateek's cousin; Monica's husband (2015–2017)
 Eklavya Ahir as Child Samar "Molu" Modi (2014–2015)
 Uppekha Jain as Monica "Mona" Modi: Samar's wife (2016–2017)
 Hiteeka Ruchchandran as Jr. Rashi Modi: Radha and Jigar's daughter; Sahir and Samar's half-sister; Meera, Vidya, Ramakant and Prateek's cousin (2015–2016)
 Paras Tomar as Prateek "Pappu" Desai: Kinjal and Dhaval's son; Meera, Sahir, Samar, Vidya, Ramakant and Jr. Rashi's cousin (2015)
 Vansh Sayani as Child Prateek "Pappu" Desai (2014–2015)
 Ayaan as Jai Modi: Sonakshi and Sahir's elder son; Veeru, Geeta and Jr. Sita's brother (2016–2017)
 Vihaan as Veeru Modi: Sonakshi and Sahir's younger son; Jai, Geeta and Jr. Sita's brother (2016–2017)
 Vandana Pathak as Gaura Suryavanshi: Kokila's enemy and former friend; Dharam's mother; Shravan, Naiya, Medha and Jr. Ahem's grandmother (2015–2017)
 Pubali Sanyal as Durga Suryavanshi: Dharam's first wife; Shravan and Naiya's mother; Priyal's grandmother (2015–2016) (Dead)
 Kashvi as Priyal Suryavanshi: Vidya and Shravan's daughter (2016–2017)
 Pratibha Tiwari as Naiya Agarwal: Dharam and Durga's daughter; Shravan's sister; Medha and Jr. Ahem's half-sister; Prakash's wife (2016)
 Harsh Rajput as Prakash Agarwal: Naiya's husband (2016)
 Ashnoor Kaur as Panna Singhania: Sonia's sister; Gopi's little neighbor (2010)
 Digangana Suryavanshi as Sonia Singhania: Panna's sister; Gopi's neighbor (2010)
 Gopi Desai as Revati Desai: Praful, Paresh, Kokila and Jigna's mother; Ahem and Kinjal's grandmother (2010–2014)
 Seema Deshmukh as Jigna Rajput: Revati's daughter; Praful, Paresh and Kokila's sister; Sameer's wife (2012)
 Neeru Agarwal as Mani Chatterji: Modis' first maid; Meethi's cousin (2011–2012)
 Beena Bhatt as Meethi Chatterji: Modis' second maid; Mani's cousin (2012–2016)
 Iira Soni as Anita Shroff: Umang's sister; Ahem's ex-fiancé; Sameera's mother (2010–2012)
 Akshay Sethi/Anas Khan as Umang Mehta: Anita's brother; Kinjal's ex-fiancé; Tripti and Radha's husband. (2010-2013) (Dead)
 Pooja Welling as Tripti Mehta: Umang's first wife and murderer (2013–2014)
 Deepak Dutta as Jay Mehta: Veena's husband; Paridhi's father (2014–2015)
 Manoj Chandila as Anurag Joshi: Gopi's colleague and obsessive lover; Meera's tutor; Rashi's murderer (2014)
 Shresth Kumar as Vivaan Khanna: Paridhi's ex-fiancé (2014–2015)
 Khalid Siddiqui as Dr. Krishna Raheja: Pramila's son; Mansi's brother (2016)
 Kajal Pisal as Mansi Raheja: Pramila's daughter; Krishna's sister; Ahem's obsessive lover; Meera and Vidya's foster mother. (2015–2016)
 Utkarsha Naik as Pramila Raheja: Mansi and Krishna's mother (2016)
 Karan Khandelwal as Sanskar Patel: Meera's ex-fiancé (2015–2016)
 Heemakshi Ujjain as Premlata: Kokila's imposter (2016)
 Shagufta Ali as Urvashi Singh: Parag's former wife; Jaggi's mother (2016–2017)
 Anju Tiwari as Chanda: Medha and Jr. Ahem's surrogate mother (2016–2017)
 Priya Tandon as Sameera Jaiswal: Anita's daughter; Ramakant's former wife; Pinku's wife (2017)
 Vishal as Pankaj "Pinku" Jaiswal: Sameera's husband (2017)
 Rajesh Puri as Keshavlal "Keshav" Rathod: Bhavani's husband; Sita's father (2017)
 Priya Marathe as Bhavani Rathod: Keshavlal's second wife; Sita's step-mother (2017)
 Puneett Chouksey as Karan Kapoor: Dharam's business partner (2017)
 Nutan Rai as Shanella: Ramakant's ex-fiancée. (2017)
 Payal Ghosh as Radhika: Jaggi's bride (2016)
 Sidharth Jain as ACP Officer Ritesh Parmar (2016)
 Mohit Sehgal as Gaurav Bansal (2010)
 Soni Singh as Karishma Shergill: Rashi's colleague (2010)
 Garima Tiwari as Sonal: Damini's daughter; Jigar's ex-fiancée (2010)
 Akanksha Juneja as Daksha: Savita's daughter (2013)
 Gurpreet Kaur as Neelam / Kusum: A woman who came in as a maid to create trouble for the Modis. (2012)

Guest appearances

Production

Casting 

In May 2012, lead Giaa Manek signed on to appear on the reality show Jhalak Dikhhla Jaa on rival network Colors TV. Saathiya producers objected, noting that Manek was under contract with their network and that doing a reality series could tarnish her onscreen image as a soft-spoken character. The producers took their complaints to the Association of Motion Pictures and TV Programme Producers (AMPTPP) and to Cine and TV Artistes’ Association (CINTAA) for arbitration. Members of CINTAA had meetings with Manek and asked her to quit the reality show. Manek declined and Star replaced her with Devoleena Bhattacharjee.

In January 2014, Rucha Hasabnis playing Rashi confirmed that she planned to quit the series any time in that year. However, owing to her marriage she decided to quit acting and she exited in August 2014 with her character being killed.

In May 2016, Mohammed Nazim playing Ahem quit the show and his character was killed off in the show. The reason from a source stated, "Since the existing key actors aired their reservations about playing grandparents, the creatives had no option but to put the time leap on hold. Something drastic needed to be done to liven up the storyline. After brainstorming, the best idea seemed to bump off Ahem's character, so a new man could be introduced in protagonist Gopi's life to take the story forward," Then, Khalid Siddiqui was cast opposite Bhattacharjee as Krishna in May 2016. As their story was not well received by the viewers, with a decrease in ratings, in July 2016, Nazim was made to re-enter the series as Jaggi, a look-a-like of Ahem's illegitimate twin half-brother and the story focused on him and Bhattacharjee.

In September 2015, Lovely Sasan playing Paridhi quit the series as she did not want to play the role of a mother. However, after sometime when the makers approached her, she agreed and returned in March 2016.

Filming
Based on Gujarat as backdrop, the series was mainly filmed at sets in Mira road near Mumbai. The outside shell of the Modi Mansion shown in the episodes was of the Shubham Villa located in Madh Island. In December 2012, a sequence was shot at Bhuj, Gujarat for 10 days. In March 2013, a sequence was shot at Madh Island.

Besides, some sequences were also filmed at foreign locations including Switzerland in May 2011 and Singapore in February and March 2017. Earlier, US was planned but was cancelled due to Visa issues of Mohammad Nazim and Singapore was finalized.

Reboot series

On 26 May 2021, Shoonya Square Productions announced that they will be producing a reboot version of Saathiya on Star Plus's Sister channel Star Bharat with similar cast figures like Giaa Manek, Mohammad Nazim, Rupal Patel and Vandana Vithlani reprising their roles. Along with these actors, they will be several new characters with a different storyline but the same concept of a Gujarati Joint-Family. The show airs on Star Bharat, the sister channel of StarPlus. In early July 2021 the title was finalized as Tera Mera Saath Rahe. On 25 July 2021, the first promo was released featuring Giaa Manek and Rupal Patel. The reboot version was broadcast from 16 August 2021 and ended on 17 July 2022.

Adaptations

Dubbed series and remakes
Saath Nibhaana Saathiya has spawned several different language remakes including Intiki deepam illalu (Telugu), Pudhcha Paaul (Marathi), Deivam Thandha Veedu (Tamil),  Chandanamazha (Malayalam), Amritavarshini (Kannada) and Bodhuboron (Bengali). It was dubbed in Telugu as Kodala Kodala Koduku Pellamaa on Star Maa and in Vietnamese as Am Muu Va Tin Yeu. All the versions including the dubbed one became successful ones being one of the most watched TV programmes in their respective regions, crossing 1000+ episodes, Tamil version ended with 992 episodes and the Telugu dubbed version ended with 854 episodes.

In 2016, this series was dubbed in Indonesian and aired under the title Gopi (according to the main character) starting 15 September 2016 until 19 April 2017. Re-airing in Indonesia starting 17 March 2021 on ANTV.

In 2021, despite earlier dubbed, it was remade in Telugu as Intiki Deepam Illalu on Star Maa.

International broadcast
Saath Nibhaana Saathiya aired in Pakistan on Urdu 1 and H Now Entertainment but was later discontinued due to ban on Indian content in the country. It also aired in Sri Lanka dubbed inSinhala as "Mage Sanda Obai" on Swarnavahini. In Indonesia, it began airing on ANTV from 26 September 2016 under the title Gopi but was airing from Monday to Friday at 3:00 pm (Indonesia Western Time). It was broadcast by THVL 1 in Vietnam with the title Âm Mưu Và Tình Yêu. In Bulgaria, the series was dubbed in Bulgarian as Остани с мен on Diema Family. The series has been dubbed into Turkish as Masum on Kanal 7 where it began to air in March 2020 and ended on 30 July 2021.

Reception

Critics

Hindustan Times appreciated the series for the majority cast being new comers however criticised the series as "The loud clothes and backward settings induce a pukey sensation. There's serious amount of overacting involved by the actors, whether they play protagonists or mums and dads. It't’s too old fashioned and boring".

Ratings
Initially starting with low viewership in May 2010, it increased gradually and also became one of the top rated Hindi GEC at that time. As in early November 2010, it occupied the top position with 5.3 TVR. As the ratings increased, It was acclaimed by Hindustan Times for redefining the 7:00pm (IST) slot as a prime time.

In the first week of 2011, it was the most watched Hindi GEC with 6.3 TVR. In week ending 26 March 2011, it occupied fourth position with 5 TVR. In week 13 of 2011, it was at third position with 5.31 TVR. In the week ending 9 April 2011, it was at the second position with 4.96 TVR. In week ending 3 September 2011, it topped with 6.3 TVR. In week 43, it was at top position with 6.5 TVR. In week 50, at December, the series garnered its highest rating of 7.58 TVR, being most watched Hindi GEC in that week, being the first Hindi GEC to garner that rating in its 7:00 pm (IST) slot. In week ending 3 December 2011, it maintained its top position garnering 6.26 TVR. Overall, it was the most watched Indian Hindi television show of 2011.

It maintained its first position in first week of 2012 garnering 6 TVR. On week 19 2012, it occupied first position with 5+ TVR, beating Yeh Rishta Kya Kehlata Hai which was in that position the previously week. In the week ending 21 July 2012, it was at sixth position with 2.9 TVR. In the last six months, the ratings of the series dipped averaging about 6 TVR to 3+ TVR, being one of the most watched Hindi GEC. As in mid December 2012, it was at third position with 4.3 TVR.

In June 2013, it was the sixth most watched Hindi GEC fiction with a trp of 2.6. In week 43 and 44, it garnered 7.4 and 7.5 million viewership. Overall, during 2013, it became the seventh most watched Indian Hindi Television program with an average of 6.4 million and peak of 8.7 million viewership.

In week 4 of 2014, it garnered a rating of 4.6 TVR. On week 49, it was in third position with 3.9 TVR. Overall, it still continued to maintain its position in the weekly list of top 10 Hindi GECs during 2014.

In second week of July 2015, it was at the top position. On week 32 of 2015, it was the most watched with 4 TVR while the previous week, it shared the first position with Kumkum Bhagya garnering 3.8 TVR. From week 33 to 35, it garnered 3.6, 3.4 and 3.6 TVR, maintaining its position in top five shows. In second week of September 2015, it was at second position with 4.3 TVR. In 2015, overall it maintained its weekly position in top ten watched Hindi GEC ranging between 3.5 and 4 TVR.

In week 4 of 2016, it garnered a TRP of 3.5 occupying third position. In week ending 29 April 2016, it was at third position with 10.51 million impressions and the following week at fourth position with 10.25 million impressions. In week 26, it was at third position with 9.386 million impressions. In week 35, it occupied second position with 10.68 million impressions. In week 41 it was at third position with 10.074 million impressions.

In week 4 of 2017, it was at seventh position in urban areas. Maintaining its position in top ten programs since weeks after the premiere, in 2017, the viewership dipped with it moving out of top ten Hindi GEC. In week 27 of 2017, it garnered 6.7 million impressions occupied twelfth position.

The rerun of the series in Star Utsav during COVID-19 lockdown in 2020 became one of the top five watched Hindi GEC.

In popular culture 
The clip from an episode where the lead character Gopi (Giaa Manek) washes a laptop went viral and was subjected to various trolls and criticism.

On 21 August 2020, music composer Yashraj Mukhate uploaded an edited video which featured the characters Kokila (Rupal Patel), Rashi (Rucha Hasabnis) and Gopi (Gia Manek) in the soap opera by adding rap song to a dialogue delivery by Rupal Patel in which Kokila scolds Rashi for putting up the cooker without the chana (known also as gram or chickpeas) in the kitchen. The video quickly garnered over 4.5 million views as on 24 August 2020 in Instagram and memes also trended related to the rap song.

Awards
 Indian Television Academy Awards 2011: Best Actress Popular - Giaa Manek (Gopi Modi) 
 Indian Television Academy Awards 2011: Best Show Popular - Saath Nibhaana Saathiya
 Indian Telly Awards 2012: Best Actress in a Lead Role - Giaa Manek (Gopi Modi)
 Indian Telly Awards 2012: Best Actress in a Supporting Role - Rupal Patel (Kokila Modi)
 Gold Awards 2012: Best Actress in a Supporting Role - Rupal Patel (Kokila Modi)
 Indian Television Academy Awards 2013: Best Actress Popular - Devoleena Bhattacharjee (Gopi Modi) 
 Gold Awards 2014: Best Actor in a Supporting Role - Vishal Singh (Jigar Modi)
 Indian Television Academy Awards 2015: Best Serial Drama - Saath Nibhaana Saathiya
 Indian Telly Awards 2015: Best Daily Series - Saath Nibhaana Saathiya
 Indian Telly Awards 2015: Best Actress in a Lead Role - Devoleena Bhattacharjee (Gopi Modi)
 Gold Awards 2015: Best Television Show (Fiction) -  Saath Nibhaana Saathiya
 BIG Star Entertainment Awards 2015: Most Entertaining Television Actor (Female) - Devoleena Bhattacharjee (Gopi Modi)
 BIG Star Entertainment Awards 2015: Most Entertaining Television Actor (Male) - Mohammad Nazim (Ahem Modi)
 Gold Awards 2016: Best actress in a Lead Role Critics (Jury) - Devoleena Bhattacharjee (Gopi Modi)
 Gold Awards 2016: Popular Bahu On Indian Television - Devoleena Bhattacharjee (Gopi Modi)
 Lion Gold Awards 2018: Best Actor in Supporting Role - Amar Upadhyay (Dharam Suryavanshi)

References

External links
 Official Website
 Saath Nibhaana Saathiya on IMDb

2010 Indian television series debuts
2017 Indian television series endings
Indian television soap operas
Serial drama television series
StarPlus original programming
Television shows set in Gujarat